Shergarh may refer to the following places:

In India 
 Shergarh, Kaithal, a village in Kaithal, Haryana
 Shergarh, Sirsa, a village in Sirsa, Haryana
 Shergarh, Balasore, site of Mahishamardini Temple in Balasore, Odisha
 Shergarh, Jalandhar, a village in Punjab
 Shergarh, Rajasthan, a village in Jodhpur , Rajasthan
 Shergarh tehsil, a tehsil in Jodhpur, Rajasthan
 Shergarh, Uttar Pradesh, a town in Bareilly, Uttar Pradesh
 Shergarh, Raebareli, a village in Uttar Pradesh, India
 Purana Qila or Shergarh, a fort in Delhi, India

In Pakistan 
 Shergarh, Mansehra, a village in Mansehra, Khyber Pakhtunkhwa
 Shergarh, Mardan, a town in Mardan, Khyber Pakhtunkhwa
 Shergarh, Punjab, a union council in Okara, Punjab
 Shergarh, Sindh, a town in Jamshoro, Sindh

See also
 Sher Garhi Palace, a palace in Srinagar, Jammu and Kashmir, India
 Shergar, a racehorse